The 2007 NCAA Division I softball tournament was held from May 17 through June 4, 2007. 64 NCAA Division I college softball teams met after having played their way through a regular season, and for some, a conference tournament, to play in the NCAA Tournament.  The tournament culminated with eight teams playing in the Women's College World Series at ASA Hall of Fame Stadium in Oklahoma City, Oklahoma.

Automatic bids
Conference champions from 29 Division I conferences earned automatic bids to regionals.  The remaining 35 spots were awarded to schools as at-large invitees.

National seeds
Bold indicates WCWS participant.

Arizona
Northwestern
Oklahoma
Texas A&M
Tennessee
Washington
Arizona St.
Baylor

9 Michigan
10 LSU
11 Alabama
12 UCLA
13 Florida
14 DePaul
15 North Carolina St.
16 Virginia Tech

Regionals and super regionals

Bold indicates winner. "*" indicates host.

Tucson Super Regional

Waco Super Regional

Knoxville Super Regional

College Station Super Regional

Norman Super Regional

Seattle Super Regional

Tempe Super Regional

Evanston Super Regional

Women's College World Series

Participants

† Excludes results of the pre-NCAA Women's College World Series of 1969 through 1981.

Tournament notes
Washington's Danielle Lawrie and Tennessee's Monica Abbott each pitched no-hitters on the first day of the tournament, although Lawrie allowed a run. This is the first time a no-hitter has been accomplished since the 2003 Women's College World Series and only the third time in the NCAA era of the WCWS that two pitchers had no-hitters on the same day.
This was the first time that UCLA did not advance to the WCWS in its NCAA era.
Only one game in the entire tournament ended with the losing team scoring more than one run, an NCAA record for offensive futility.

Bracket

Game results

Championship game

Final standings

All Tournament Team
The following players were members of the All-Tournament Team.

WCWS records tied or broken
The 2007 tournament was ruled by pitchers, as 11 shutouts were thrown over the week, an NCAA record. Tennessee alone didn't allow a run in the entire tournament until the 10th inning of the second game of the finals.
After fanning 11 Lady Vols in the final game, Arizona's Taryne Mowatt passed Tennessee's Monica Abbott for the WCWS single-season NCAA strikeout record. Mowatt struck out 76 batters in 2007, while Abbott finished with 75 strikeouts. (Both passed the previous record held by the previous Arizona pitcher, Alicia Hollowell, who held the record with 65).
Mowatt's 60 innings pitched in the 2007 College World Series broke the previous NCAA record of 53 held by Michigan's Jennie Ritter (2005). Mowatt delivered every Arizona pitch in this year's event. 
Arizona's Kristie Fox recorded her 11th hit of the 2007 WCWS, tying the NCAA record of UCLA's Natasha Watley set in 2003. 
The Lady Vols’ Kenora Posey tied the WCWS single-season NCAA steals record with four. She shares the top spot with Lowe, who had four steals in 2006, and two others. 
The 2007 event marked the best-attended Women's College World Series in history. A total of 62,463 fans passed through the gates of ASA Hall of Fame Stadium, including 5,533 for the third game. The 2007 attendance total broke the previous WCWS record (set in 2006) by 16,341.

See also 
NCAA Division I Softball Championship

External links
NCAA Softball

NCAA Division I softball tournament
Tournament